The England Korfball League is the highest echelon of korfball in England. The winner of the England Korfball League qualifies for the IKF Korfball Europa Cup. The number 10 relegates direct and the number 9 can try to remain in the top division by ending up in the top two of promotion/relegation play-off. The English Korfball Association is the administrator of the league.

Champions

Multiple Champions

References

 
2005 establishments in England
Sports leagues in England
Sports leagues established in 2005
Korfball in England
Korfball competitions
Professional sports leagues in the United Kingdom